Topla is a dispersed settlement of isolated farmsteads in a valley with the same name at the foothills of Mount Peca west of Črna na Koroškem in the Carinthia region in northern Slovenia, close to the border with Austria.

References

External links
Topla on Geopedia

Populated places in the Municipality of Črna na Koroškem